Szabolcs was an administrative county (comitatus) of the Kingdom of Hungary. Its territory is now part of Hungary, except for three villages which are in the Zakarpattia Oblast of Ukraine. The capital of the county was Nyíregyháza.

Geography

Szabolcs county shared borders with the counties of Borsod, Zemplén, Ung, Bereg, Szatmár, Bihar and Hajdú. It was situated mostly south of the river Tisza. Its area was 4,637 km² around 1910.

History
Szabolcs is one of the oldest counties of the Kingdom of Hungary. In the 17th century, the towns of Hajdú separated from the county, creating the Hajdú district. The capital of Szabolcs County was initially Szabolcs (now a village), later Nagykálló took over this role (1747-1867), and since 1867 the capital was moved to Nyíregyháza. 

After World War I, it was merged with a very small part of the former Ung County to form Szabolcs-Ung county, with Nyíregyháza as the capital. However, the villages of Eszeny (present-day Esen), Szalóka (present-day Solovka) and Tiszaágtelek (present-day Tisaahtelek) in the Tisza district were passed to Czechoslovakia. These villages were returned to Hungary between 1938 and 1945, but were passed to the Soviet Union afterwards (they are part of Ukraine since 1991). In 1950, the county was disestablished and Szabolcs-Szatmár County was created, which included most of its territory, while some parts of it were passed to the newly created Borsod-Abaúj-Zemplén and Hajdú-Bihar counties (area around Polgár and north-east of Debrecen). In 1990, Szabolcs-Szatmár County was renamed to Szabolcs-Szatmár-Bereg County.

Demographics

Nyíregyháza, the capital of Szabolcs County, was founded around 1750 as a Slovak Lutheran settlement, and had an ethnic Slovak majority until the latter part of the 19th century, when the population became Magyarized. Also, Szabolcs County had a sizeable population of Greek Catholics, who were of Ruthenian and Romanian origin and who became almost entirely Magyarized by the end of the 19th century.

Subdivisions

In the early 20th century, the subdivisions of Szabolcs county were:

Notes

References

States and territories established in the 11th century
States and territories established in 1938
States and territories disestablished in 1920
States and territories disestablished in 1923
States and territories disestablished in 1950
Counties in the Kingdom of Hungary